DCEbus is a computer bus standard, originally developed for industrial control computers interfacing to the "real world" by the Belgian company Data Applications International. It is physically based on Eurocard sizes, mechanicals and 31-pin connectors (DIN 41617 similar to the DIN 41612 but simpler), and using its own signalling system, which Eurocard does not define. It was first developed in 1970 but was never adopted by any other company.  

The 24 I/O lines available on the DCEbus (from an Intel 8255 of the controlling computer) could be used directly, or could use the "DCE bus mode", in which the 24 I/O lines were grouped in three groups of eight I/O lines, of which the first group was used for data, and of the second group two were used for read and write strobes, and one for "bus expansion", the third group was used for eight "card address lines". Most often these setup was used to control another Intel 58255 on the actual interface card. The remaining seven pins of the 31-pin DIN connector were used for power and ground signals.

Available cards

About twenty interface cards were available:

 RWC-T24       Generic TTL interface module
 RWC-D12        Isolated digital input and output module
 RWC-DI24       Isolated digital input module
 RWC-AI            Analog Input module
 RWC-V8/16    Analog high speed Data Acquisition module
 RWC-A02        Analog Output module
 RWC-CCE        Double serial communication module
 RWC-SLD        Serial linecontrol module
 RWC-MC/DC  DC Current control module
 RWC-HC/DC  DC Large current control module
 RWC-PTM       Position and temperature measurement module
 RWC-MUX       4-wire multiplex module
 RWC-IEC         IEC (IEEE) Bus module
 RWC-F             Experimental module
 RWC-SBM        Bus system monitor
 RWC-PWR        Power supply
 RWC-PWR/H   Power supply larger systems
 RWC-PRG        EPROM programmer module
 RWC-FM/BSC Bisynchronous serial IBM protocol

References

Computer buses